The International School of Penang (Uplands), commonly known as Uplands School or simply Uplands by its members (called Uplanders), is one of the International Schools in Penang, Malaysia.  Founded in 1955, it was first situated on Penang Hill, moving to Gurney Drive and finally Batu Ferringhi in 2006. Uplands School is a multicultural, multiracial and multinational community whose aim is to promote the School Motto: "Respect for Self. Respect for Others".

Overview

Uplands occupies a five-and-a-half-acre site near to the sea in the tourist area of Batu Ferringhi, approximately eleven kilometres from George Town.  Housed in new buildings from 2006, facilities include 36 classrooms, five laboratories, two drama rooms, two music rooms, two computer labs, an indoor multi purpose hall, a 25-metre outdoor swimming pool, and a games field.  The school also provides firewalled wireless internet access for students and staff who use their own mobile computers at school.

Students are mainly divided into thirteen year groups. The school curriculum incorporates the International Baccalaureate Primary Years Programme (PYP) for Years 1 to 6., a school developed program for Years 7 to 9, and a wide range of subject choices for the IGCSE (Years 10 to 11). In Years 12 and 13 Uplands students complete the highly regarded International Baccalaureate Diploma Programme (IBDP) German, French, Japanese, Mandarin and Malay are among the language subjects offered, and there is a strong ESL programme for pupils for whom English is not their first language.  The maximum class size is 25. Over one-half of the staff are expatriate teachers, many with previous international experience.  A Special Educational Needs Department caters for children with mild learning disabilities.  Uplands has recently been accredited by the Council of International Schools (CIS), which is a membership community working collaboratively to shape international education through professional services to schools, higher education institutions, and individuals. The school is authorised to offer courses leading to the IB Diploma.

Uplands has a student body that represents around 37 different countries.  They number in the region of 700, between the ages of 4 and 19.  Student boarding accommodation is available nearby for children of eight years and above.  Year 1 to 6 students wear a green/khaki batik uniform with brown pants or skirts. Year 7 to 11 students wear green polo shirts with khaki skirts or trousers, while sixth formers only need to adhere to a black/white dress code.  The school is split into four houses for academic and sporting activities; Crag (red), Hill (green), School (blue) and Kelawai (orange). The students in the latter years follow the IB program. A program that is notable with the likes of Mr. Rao teaching maths.

Accreditation and membership
Uplands is an IB World School, recognised and accredited by the following organisations:

Malaysian Ministry of Education (MME)
International Baccalaureate Organization (IBO)
Cambridge International Examinations (CIE)
Edexcel International Examinations
The Council of International Schools (CIS)

The school is also a member of the Federation of British International Schools in South East Asia (FOBISEA) and the Boarding Schools Association (BSA)..

History

The Early Years 1955 - 1977 
The International School of Penang (Uplands) was established during the Malayan Emergency. During this time the Malayan Communist Party (MCP) were waging a guerrilla war focused on crippling Malaya’s economy by sabotaging rubber and oil palm estates, as well as tin mines. As the violence throughout the peninsula intensified the Executive Council of the Incorporated Society of Planters (ISP) set in motion a plan for a school in a secure location where they could educate their young children.

A lease for Crag Hotel on Penang Hill was negotiated with the Penang State Government and considerable work was undertaken to prepare the dilapidated buildings for their first intake of nearly 60 boarders in the Easter Term of 1955. A number of new students were also absorbed from an existing small private school on the Hill which was called Uplands, a name which the new school adopted. As the school bell rang and classes began 2000 ft above sea level, accessible only by rickety funicular, the turmoil of the Emergency must have seemed a world away.

Due in part to its seclusion, the School quickly became a cosy, self-sufficient and close-knit community, where everybody was regarded as family. School days were leisurely, with classes beginning at 9am in consideration for the teachers who had to commute up the Hill and walk over a mile from the train station to the School.

Living on the Hill also came with other unique challenges. During the early years all laundry was done by hand, so uniforms and game kits were only changed once a week. “By then, all items of clothing could have walked themselves and tiny red ants with a fiery bite had taken to hiding in the seams of our dresses”. All daily necessities such as food supplies had to be ordered from Georgetown and transported up to the School, first by funicular and then by a cart which was pulled by the School’s hardy auxiliary staff. As the water supply to the Hill was interrupted every now and then, the students would often have to resort to bucket baths and other water-saving tactics.

In 1972, Queen Elizabeth II and the Duke of Edinburgh visited Penang Hill as part of their Malaysia and Singapore tour. The Uplands community turned out in full force to welcome the Royal Highnesses who happily spent their time mingling and chatting with students and staff.

The Downtown Years 1977 - 2005 
After 22 remarkable years on the Hill, Uplands finally reached the limits of possible expansion. With the Communist threat now extinguished, the time had come for the school to move out of its isolation and bring its brand of quality education to the wider Penang community. In the 1950s, most of Uplands’ students came from expatriate planter and mining families. By the 1970s, the school had a broader mix of students from different backgrounds, including more Malaysian students.

In 1976, Uplands started to take in day students and opened its Secondary Department with seven students in Form 1. To cater to this expansion and new needs, the School made the strategic move from its hilltop haven to a new location on Kelawai Road. The move to sea level went without a hitch and on September 11, 1977, the boarding house opened its doors, with lessons at the Kelawai Road campus beginning a day later.

The Burma Road boarding house was a large mansion with five dormitories and two common rooms that accommodated about 60 boarders. The school campus on Kelawai Road started with eight classrooms and two small offices. Many missed the cool air and tranquillity of the Hill, but the move was also a cause for celebration. The new school had access to a huge sports field for regular and interschool matches, and the boarders were now allowed out on excursions to parks, movies and concerts.

Predictably, with the move, the number of students increased even further, beginning a rapid era of growth for the school. From seven students in Form 1 in 1977, the numbers shot up to 70 by 1979. In 1980, in a proud moment for the school, Uplands first three candidates sat for their O-Level examinations.

As Malaysia transitioned from a primary-sector focussed economy to a manufacturing economy from the early 1970s onwards, the change was also apparent in the School’s enrolment. By 1983, most of the students’ parents were professionals or business people, with only ten percent from the planting community. Uplands became more and more multicultural and this diversity became a significant hallmark of the School that continues to the present day.One feature of Uplands, which ought to be noticeable but isn’t, is the number of nationalities represented here. We do not seem to be aware of each other as Chinese, German, Indian, Swedish or whatever. Everyone is accepted only as a person. - P.E Drury (Principal 1972-1984)The rapid expansion of the 1980s involved some ingenuity on the School’s part as it renovated and changed buildings to meet its expanding needs. By the mid-1980s the Junior School had moved over to the Burma Road house, which meant shifting the boarders to a new campus of three houses along York road, while the building along Kelawai Road housed the Senior School. Uplands’ multi-campus years did not last long, as the school was able to successfully negotiate for the lease of the historic St Joseph’s Novitiate. The imposing Novitiate, behind the Senior building, was a former training institute run by the La Salle Brothers and had been unoccupied for 17 years.

The “Big Move” took place in 1988 was a typical Uplands community affair as staff and senior pupils took the day off to pack up the School and cart boxes across the field to St Joseph’s Novitiate. Finally, the entire School - including the Junior and Senior Schools, and boarding facilities - was located n the same site for the first time since the School left Penang Hill.

In academic matters, Uplands was also making huge strides befitting its position as one of the oldest and most established international schools in Penang and Malaysia. In addition to offering the International General Certificate of Secondary Education (IGCSE), the School’s Sixth Form, offering Cambridge A-Level courses in the Sciences and Humanities, was officially launched in 1996. By 1999/2000, with a healthy population numbering over 600 students, the School marked two significant new academic achievements.

The first was the receipt of authorisation from the International Baccalaureate Organisation to offer the prestigious IB Diploma Programme, making it one of only two international schools in Malaysia to offer this programme. Not one to rest on its laurels, Uplands also succeeded in obtaining accreditation by the European Council of International Schools (ECIS), the world’s oldest and largest association of international schools, as well as the New England Association of Schools and Colleges (NEASC), giving it the distinction of being the first and only school in Malaysia.

Home Sweet Home 2006 - Present 
For half a century, from its establishment right up until 2006, Uplands had always been housed in leased buildings, a situation that had deprived the school of a sense of permanence. In 1998, a memorandum of understanding was penned for a purpose-built school building to be located in Bukit Jambul. Unfortunately, the plans fell through and the start of the new millennium came and went with no news of an impending move insight.

However, it wasn’t long after that the School was able to acquire land in Batu Ferringhi, and during the academic year 2000/2001 the Penang Municipal Council granted the School planning permission for the construction of its new campus. The new four-acre Uplands campus in Batu Ferringhi was finally launched in 2006 to much fanfare and a sense of accomplishment. The further construction and opening of F-Block on April 16, 2016 provided the School with additional classrooms, activity and assembly space.

References

External links 

Uplands website

British international schools in Malaysia
Cambridge schools in Malaysia
International Baccalaureate schools in Malaysia
Educational institutions established in 1955
1955 establishments in Malaya
Malaysia–United Kingdom relations
Schools in Penang